The Annapolis Group is an American organization of independent liberal arts colleges. It represents approximately 130 liberal arts colleges in the United States. These colleges work together to promote a greater understanding of the goals of a liberal arts education through their websites, as well as through independent research. Its current chair is Stephen D. Schutt, the president of Lake Forest College.

Background
The Annapolis Group was first organized in early 1993 in Annapolis, Maryland. Its original members included and expanded upon the Oberlin Group which was first organized in 1984. The Annapolis Group was created by the presidents of Franklin & Marshall College, Gettysburg College, and Dickinson College.

Criticism of rankings
An article was published on the website for the Annapolis Group (collegenews.org) in 2004, titled, "Liberal Arts College Presidents Speak Out on College Rankings." The article included statements made by the presidents of Dickinson, Reed, Puget Sound, St. John's College, Hamilton, Earlham, Hendrix, Colgate, Washington & Jefferson, Centre, Ursinus, Connecticut, Kenyon, Mt. Holyoke, and Skidmore.

Presidents Letter
The Presidents Letter (dated May 10, 2007), developed by Lloyd Thacker of the Education Conservancy, was sent to college and university presidents in the United States in May 2007, concerning the U.S. News & World Report college rankings. The letter does not ask for a full boycott but rather states that:

Instead, it asks presidents not to participate in the "reputational survey" portion of the overall survey (this section accounts for 25% of the total rank and asks college presidents to give their subjective opinion of other colleges). The letter also asks presidents not to use the rankings as a form of publicity:

List of colleges and universities

Twelve college  and university presidents originally signed the letter in early May. The letter currently has 130 signatures, though others may be added at a later date.

2007 movement

On June 19, 2007, during the annual meeting of the Annapolis Group, members discussed this letter. As a result, "a majority of the approximately 80 presidents at the meeting said that they did not intend to participate in the U.S. News reputational rankings in the future." The statement also said that its members "have agreed to participate in the development of an alternative common format that presents information about their colleges for students and their families to use in the college search process." This database will be web based and developed in conjunction with higher education organizations including the National Association of Independent Colleges and Universities and the Council of Independent Colleges.

On June 22, 2007, U.S. News & World Report editor Robert Morse issued a response in which he argued, "In terms of the peer assessment survey, we at U.S. News firmly believe the survey has significant value because it allows us to measure the 'intangibles' of a college that we can't measure through statistical data. Plus, the reputation of a school can help get that all-important first job and plays a key part in which grad school someone will be able to get into. The peer survey is by nature subjective, but the technique of asking industry leaders to rate their competitors is a commonly accepted practice. The results from the peer survey also can act to level the playing field between private and public colleges." In reference to the alternative database discussed by the Annapolis Group, Morse also argued, "It's important to point out that the Annapolis Group's stated goal of presenting college data in a common format has been tried before [...] U.S. News has been supplying this exact college information for many years already. And it appears that NAICU will be doing it with significantly less comparability and functionality. U.S. News first collects all these data (using an agreed-upon set of definitions from the Common Data Set). Then we post the data on our website in easily accessible, comparable tables. In other words, the Annapolis Group and the others in the NAICU initiative actually are following the lead of U.S. News."

References

Notes

External links
 

College and university associations and consortia in the United States
.